The 2021 West Georgia Wolves football team represented the University of West Georgia as a member of the Gulf South Conference (GSC) during the 2021 NCAA Division II football season. They were led by fifth-year head coach David Dean. The Wolves played their home games at University Stadium in Carrollton, Georgia.

Previous season
The Wolves finished the 2019 season 6–5, 4–4 in Gulf South Conference (GSC) play, to finish fourth in the conference standings. On August 12, 2020, Gulf South Conference postponed fall competition in 2020 for several sports due to the COVID-19 pandemic. A few months later in November, the conference announced that there will be no spring conference competition in football. Teams that opt-in to compete would have to schedule on their own. The Wolves did not compete in the 2020 season and opted out of spring competition.

Schedule
West Georgia announced their 2021 football schedule on May 3, 2021.

Rankings

Notes
1. West Georgia's game against Delta State on November 13, 2021, is a non-conference game despite both teams being GSC members, to balance the effect on each team's schedule of Florida Tech cancelling its football program.

References

West Georgia
West Georgia Wolves football seasons
West Georgia Wolves football